The Oracle (known as The Horse's Mouth in the United States ) is a 1953 British comedy film directed by C.M. Pennington-Richards and starring Robert Beatty, Michael Medwin and Virginia McKenna. The screenplay concerns a journalist who goes on holiday to Ireland where he encounters a fortune-teller.

Production 
It was based on a radio play To Tell You the Truth by Robert Barr. It was shot at Southall Studios on a budget of £43,000.

Plot
Timothy Blake (Michael Medwin), a British reporter holidaying on a remote island offshore of Ireland, hears a man's voice coming from the bottom of a well. The voice turns out to be a modern-day Oracle, or fortune teller, whose predictions prove uncannily accurate. Bob is determined to get a story out of this, but his editor is less enthusiastic and promptly fires him. The newfound publicity though, means the once-sleepy Irish village is now invaded by curiosity seekers, and those seeking the horse racing results.

Cast
 Robert Beatty as Bob Jefferson
 Michael Medwin as Timothy Blake
 Virginia McKenna as Shelagh
 Mervyn Johns as Tom Mitchum
 Arthur Macrae as Alan Digby
 Gillian Lind as Jane Bond
 Ursula Howells as Peggy
 Louise Hampton as Miss Turner
 John Charlesworth as Denis
 Joseph Tomelty as Terry Roche
 Lockwood West as Adams
 Maire O'Neill as Mrs Lenham
 John McBride as Mick
 Derek Tansley as Idiot Boy
 Patrick McAlinney as O'Keefe
 Lionel Marson as Announcer
 Jean St. Clair as Young Girl
 Jack May as Old Man
 Gilbert Harding as Voice of the Oracle

Critical reception
Allmovie called it "A lesser comedy of the Ealing school (though not from the Ealing studios)"; the Radio Times called it a "piffling comedy in which whimsy is heaped on to make up for the absence of genuine humour"; but Fantastic Movie Musings and Ramblings thought more highly of the piece, whilst acknowledging "This is no classic, but it’s pleasant and has a little meat on its bones," and concluding the film was "Worth a look."

References

Bibliography
 Chibnall, Steve & McFarlane, Brian. The British 'B' Film. Palgrave MacMillan, 2009.
 Harper, Sue & Porter, Vincent. British Cinema of the 1950s: The Decline of Deference. Oxford University Press, 2007.

External links

1953 films
1953 comedy films
Films shot at Southall Studios
British comedy films
Films directed by C. M. Pennington-Richards
Films about gambling
Films about journalists
Films set in London
Films set in Ireland
British films based on plays
British black-and-white films
1950s English-language films
1950s British films